is a Japanese anime and OVA series produced by Tatsunoko Productions. The show was created by Tatsuo Yoshida, who had produced many of Tatsunoko's series. Other romanizations of the name include Hurricane Polymer, and Hariken Polymar (since the latter is spelled using Japanese kanji). He wears a special suit which enables him to fight crime. The suit is made of memory plastic which enables him to assume any shape, including morphing its wearer in 5 different vehicles.

A OVA remake was released in Japan on September 21, 1996, followed by episode 2 on February 21, 1997. It was later dubbed by New Generation Pictures, and was released in the United States by Urban Vision on VHS on October 1, 1998. It was re-released by Discotek Media on DVD on March 19, 2013.

Anime Sols attempted to crowd-fund the release of the show on North American DVD, but was not successful.

Overview

Plot
Onigawara, the director of the International Secret Police Agency, looked forward to making Takeshi a top-notch criminal investigator. Takeshi was given training, which turned him into an all-around sportsman as well as martial arts expert. However, Takeshi's attitude toward crime-fighting was so incompatible with Onigawara's, that he disowned him. For a while Takeshi investigated crime alone; then he became private detective Joe Kuruma's assistant and general handyman under the alias Takeshi Yoroi. Secretly, however, Takeshi obtained from a scientist a new artificial polymer, polymet, that was far stronger than steel. With this polymet Takeshi transformed himself into Hurricane Polymar, a costumed hero that fights for  justice and to defeat various gangs.

Characters
Kazuyuki Sogabe as Takeshi Yoroi/Onigawara (Polymar)
Takeshi Aono as Joe Kuruma
Miki Ochiai as Teru Nanba
Masashi Amenomori as Toragoro Onigawara
Kan Tokumaru as Inspector Deret
Kazuya Tatekabe as Baron (Danshaku)
Kei Tomiyama as Next Episode Preview Narrator

Abilities
Hurricane Polymar's main ability, aside from augmented strength and high-speed rotation, is transforming into one of five different vehicles (described below). Polymar's suit can also last up to forty-six minutes and one second before having to transform back; if Takeshi does not reverse the transformation, he is in danger of dying from hyperthermia. Since the suit is powered by magnetism, it is vulnerable to high voltage and will also lose power in temperatures lower than −50 degrees Celsius. When inactive, the suit is disguised as Takeshi's motorcycle helmet.

Polymar's vehicles are: 
Polymar Hawk (supersonic jet); 
Polymar Grampus (submarine); 
Polymar Drill (tank with twin drills); 
Polymar Machine (formula-one race car); and 
Polymar Roller (steam roller).

Media

Anime

Episode list

Other media
In the second episode of the Time Bokan: Royal Revival OVA, Polymar appears alongside other the Tatsunoko heroes. A two-part anime OVA was created in the mid-1990s entitled Hurricane Polymar: Holy Blood featuring extremists that mutate into amphibious shark-like creatures. The OVA was intended to have three episodes, but was cancelled after the second, thus ending without a proper conclusion. Urban Vision initially released it on VHS in the late 1990s, but since then the U.S. DVD rights have gone to Discotek Media. Hurricane Polymar was featured in the PlayStation game Tatsunoko Fight with him and Teru (in a costume she wore in episode 15) as playable characters along with an original character named Astral Chameleon who is composed of the souls of the criminals that died in the series. Hurricane Polymar later appeared as a playable character in the Wii video game Tatsunoko vs. Capcom: Ultimate All-Stars.

Japanese cast (OVA)
Ai Orikasa as Nina Nielsen
Michiko Neya  as Ryoko Nishida
Ryotaro Okiayu as Takeshi 
Takehito Koyasu as Pulsar
Takeshi Aono as Joe Kuruma
Tesshō Genda as Novar
Yasunori Matsumoto as Skamug
Yuko Miyamura as Namba Teru

English OVA cast
Alex Fernandez as Hurricane Polymar/Takeshi
Matt K. Miller Additional Voices
John DeMita as Joe Kuruma
Jack Fletcher as Skamug / Onigawara

Episode list (OVA)

Live action film 
On November 15, 2016, a live action film adaptation is in development with Koichi Sakamoto set as director, Shinsuke Onishi as writer and Junpei Mizobata, Yuki Yamada, Yurina Yanagi, Mikie Hara, Hatsunori Hasegawa and Satoshi Jinbo set to star in the film. It was released on May 13, 2017 in Japanese theatres. The theme song for this film is "Kanashimi Naki Sekai e" by Good Morning America.

Crossover series 

Infini-T Force is an anime series featuring a crossover between characters from Science Ninja Team Gatchaman, Casshan, Hurricane Polymar and Tekkaman: The Space Knight. The new series is a co-production between Tatsunoko and Digital Frontier and aired from October 3 to December 26, 2017.

References

External links
 
 
 Polymar at An International Catalogue of Superheroes

1974 anime television series debuts
Japanese children's animated action television series
Japanese children's animated adventure television series
Japanese children's animated science fiction television series
Japanese children's animated superhero television series
Anime with original screenplays
Science fiction anime and manga
Superheroes in anime and manga
Tatsunoko Production
TV Asahi original programming
Fictional karateka
Discotek Media